Rolling Ground is a small unincorporated community in the town of Clayton in Crawford County, Wisconsin, United States. Rolling Ground is a part of the Great Rivers Snowmobile Tour.

Geography
The community is located at the intersection of State Highway 171 on US Route 61 between Soldiers Grove, and Mount Zion.

Notes

Unincorporated communities in Wisconsin
Unincorporated communities in Crawford County, Wisconsin